Luciano de Liberato (born 6 September 1947 in Chieti, Italy) is an Italian painter.

He began working in art in 1975, immediately attracting a lot of interest among the most important Italian art critics and historians (Filiberto Menna, Maurizio Fagiolo dell’Arco, Enrico Crispolti, Marcello Venturoli, Lorenza Trucchi, Gabriele Simongini). He was considered a young master and one of the great Italian colourist painting.

Protagonist in the '80s in European painting, De Liberato has had more than fifty solo exhibitions, including two in the prestigious "Art Basel", in 1983 and 1984.
Since 1990 he has worked in his studio in the Italian province. All his work is created through research cycles.

Since 1994 he has used a unique and very personal language, as well as authentic poetry that avoids fads and mannerist trends.

In 2011 he was invited to the Italian Pavilion (Abruzzo) of the Venice Biennale. In 2012, one of his works, "RED", was chosen as an image of the Lincoln Center Festival in New York City, which gave to his work global renown.

In 2011 he decided to end all links with Italian galleries and has worked exclusively for international outlets.

Gallery

Solo exhibitions selection 
1978, Roma, Gallery Artivisive, curators Maurizio Fagiolo dell'Arco and Filiberto Menna
1983, Basel, International Art Fair Art Basel (solo show Artivisive Gallery, Roma)
1983, Bologna, Art Fair, (solo show Artivisive Gallery, Roma)
1984, Basel, International Art Fair (solo show Artivisive Gallery, Roma) Art Basel
1984, Rennes, Maison de la Culture, Galerie Andrè Malraux
1983/1988, Roma, Gallery Artivisive of Sylvia Franchi (solo show Artivisive Gallery, Roma)
1994, Bologna, Art Fair, (solo show Artivisive Gallery, Roma)
1994, Roma, Gallery La Borgognona, retrospective exhibition
1999, Milano, Bocconi University
2000, Pescara, Theater Gabriele D'Annunzio
2001, Cortina d'Ampezzo, Spazio Cultura “Nuovi itinerari” curator Milena Milani
2003/2002/2001/2000/1999, Roma, Andrè Gallery, Via Giulia
2011, Cesena, Ridotto Palace, Modern Art Gallery, Anthology
2012, New York City, Lincoln Center

Institutional group exhibitions 
1975, Francavilla al Mare, XXIX Michetti Prize
1976, Francavilla al Mare, XXX Michetti Prize
1977, Francavilla al Mare, XXXI Michetti Prize
1980, National Bolaffi Catalog, volume II, Segnalati per la pittura
1983, Francavilla al Mare, XXXVI Michetti Prize
1987, Comune di Pescara
1987, L'Aquila Alternative Attuali, edition by Enrico Crispolti
1998, Artivisive in progress, Roma, Art History, curators Domenico Amoroso, Mirella Bentivoglio, Fabrizio Crisafulli, Ed. Christengraf
1999, Giuseppe Rosato, Quei giovani amici pittori edition by Nocciano museum, essays
2002, Termoli Prize
2011, Sassoferrato, 61^ International Art Exhibition G. B. Salvi, Mostra
2011, Pescara, Aurum Museum, Italy Pavilion, Biennale di Venezia
2013, XLVI Prize Vasto
2015, L'Aquila, Fibbioni Palace, The Making of, artists at work in tv

See also 
 Abstract Art
 Contemporary art

Bibliography 

 1983, L'immagine diversa. edition by Fondazione Michetti, Marcello Venturoli
1987, L'Aquila, alternative attuali", edition by Enrico Crispolti
 1999, Quei giovani amici pittori, edition by Arts Museum Nocciano, Giuseppe Rosato, "De Liberato il solitario"
 2000, Artisti abruzzesi dal Medioevo ai giorni nostri, edition by Regione Abruzzo, Università degli Studi "Gabriele d'Annunzio", Maria Agnifili
 2008, Gabriele Simongini, Se il pennello dialoga con il mouse, Terzocchio, n°5, edition by Ulisse Editore
 2011, 61^ Rassegna Premio Salvi, La vertigine della visione, Comune di Sassoferrato

References

External links 
 

1947 births
Abruzzo
Italian contemporary artists
20th-century Italian painters
Italian male painters
21st-century Italian painters
Italian abstract artists
People from Chieti
Living people
20th-century Italian male artists
21st-century Italian male artists